Peter Hricko (born 25 July 1981 in Margecany, Czechoslovakia) is a Slovak footballer who currently plays from Slovak Fourth League club TJ OFC Gabčíkovo. He last played for Polish side Pogoń Szczecin.

Career
In June 2011, he joined Pogoń Szczecin on a two-year contract.
In September 2013, he joinedTj Ofc gabčíkovo and in that year he played in 19 games.

References

External links
 
 

1981 births
Living people
Slovak footballers
Association football defenders
ŠK Futura Humenné players
1. FC Tatran Prešov players
Sarpsborg 08 FF players
MŠK Púchov players
Slovak Super Liga players
Polonia Bytom players
Pogoń Szczecin players
Ekstraklasa players
Expatriate footballers in Poland
Slovak expatriate sportspeople in Poland
Slovak expatriate footballers
Slovak expatriate sportspeople in Norway
Expatriate footballers in Norway